Following is a list of senators of Lozère, people who have represented the department of Lozère in the Senate of France.

Third Republic

Senators for Lozère under the French Third Republic were:

 Anatole de Colombet de Landos (1876–1879)
 Joseph Dominique Aldebert de Chambrun (1876–1879)
 Thomas de Rozière (1879–1896) died in office 
 Théophile Roussel (1879–1903) died in office 
 Jean Monestier (1896–1906)
 Emmanuel de Las-Cases (1903–1933)
 Paulin Daudé-Gleize (1906–1928) died in office
 Joseph Bonnet de Paillerets (1928–1930) died in office
 Louis Bringer (1930–1941)
 Pierre de Chambrun (1933–1941)

Fourth Republic

Senators for Lozère under the French Fourth Republic were:

 Charles Morel
 Georges Bonnet

Fifth Republic 
Senators for Lozère under the French Fifth Republic:

 Georges Bonnet (1959–1973) died in office
 Jules Roujon (1973–1985) died in office
 Joseph Caupert (1985–1994) died in office
 Janine Bardou (1994–2001)
 Jacques Blanc (2001–2011)
 Alain Bertrand (2011–present)

References

Sources

 
Lists of members of the Senate (France) by department